The sport of football in the country of Guyana is run by the Guyana Football Federation. Football is the second most popular sport of Guyana, after cricket. The association administers the national football team, as well as the national football league. Although the Guyana National Team has not played a game since November 2012 due to on-going off-field disputes.

Despite Guyana being located in South America, the GFF is a member of the Confederation of North, Central America and Caribbean Association Football.

League

GFF Elite League is the national professional league in Guyana.

National team

28 January 1921 was when Guyana played its debut international match.

Guyana experienced a decline in performances in the 2000s.

Guyana qualified for Gold Cup for the first time in 2019 CONCACAF Gold Cup.

Guyana stadiums

References